Zote is a village in Champhai block of Champhai District, Mizoram state, India.

Etymology 
Zote are one of the clans of the Hmar people who are believed to first settle here. So the name of the village came to be known as "Zote".

Economy 

Zote is one of the 4 Border Haats (markets) in Mizoram, others being at Hnahlan, Vaphai (Saikhumphai) and Sangau (Pangkhua), all of whichboost the local trade and economy. As part of India's Look-East connectivity, entailing connectivity to BIMSTEC, East Asia Summit, Mekong-Ganga Cooperation, United Nations Economic and Social Commission for Asia and the Pacific, Asian Highway Network and the Trans-Asian Railway, Zote as a border town has a role to play.

Transport and connectivity

Border checkpost, customs and immigration 

Zokhawthar LCS (Land Custom Station), There is a proposal to upgrade it to ICP (Integrated Check Point) entailing immigration and customs both. is 28 km south of Zote on Look-East connectivity

Airport and railway 

Lengpui Airport in Aizawl (223 km northwest) is the nearest airport in India. Sairang railhead of Bairabi–Sairang line is the nearest railway station.

AH1 and India-Thailand Highway

India–Myanmar–Thailand Trilateral Highway (IMT), and Asian Highway Network and Asian Highway 1 (AH1) Zokhawthar-Tedim connectivity to IMT will provide an alternate route to the existing route via Moreh. via Zokhawthar provide wider connectivity to Zote.

See also 

 Borders of India

References

Villages in Lunglei district